The mixed doubles event at the 2022 South American Games was held from 12 to 14 October.

Draw

References

External links
 Doubles Mix

Mixed doubles